A strait is an oceanic landform connecting two seas. The surface water generally flows at the same elevation on both sides and through the strait in either direction. Most commonly, it is a narrow ocean channel that lies between two land masses. Some straits are not navigable, for example because they are either too narrow or too shallow, or because of an unnavigable reef or archipelago. Straits are also known to be loci for sediment accumulation. Usually, sand-size deposits occur on both the two opposite strait exits, forming subaqueous fans or deltas.

Terminology

The terms channel, pass, or passage can be synonymous and used interchangeably with strait, although each is sometimes differentiated with varying senses. In Scotland, firth or Kyle are also sometimes used as synonyms for strait.  

Many straits are economically important. Straits can be important shipping routes and wars have been fought for control of them. 

Numerous artificial channels, called canals, have been constructed to connect two oceans or seas over land, such as the Suez Canal.  Although rivers and canals often provide passage between two large lakes, and these seem to suit the formal definition of strait, they are not usually referred to as such. The term strait is typically reserved for much larger, wider features of the marine environment. There are exceptions, with straits being called canals; Pearse Canal, for example.

Comparisons
Straits are the converse of isthmuses. That is, while a strait lies between two land masses and connects two large areas of ocean, an isthmus lies between two areas of ocean and connects two large land masses.

Some straits have the potential to generate significant tidal power using tidal stream turbines. Tides are more predictable than wave power or wind power. The Pentland Firth (a strait) may be capable of generating 10 GW. Cook Strait in New Zealand may be capable of generating 5.6 GW even though the total energy available in the flow is 15 GW.

Navigational (legal) regime
Straits used for international navigation through the territorial sea between one part of the high seas or an exclusive economic zone and another part of the high seas or an exclusive economic zone are subject to the legal regime of transit passage (Strait of Gibraltar, Dover Strait, Strait of Hormuz). The regime of innocent passage applies in straits used for international navigation (1) that connect a part of high seas or an exclusive economic zone with the territorial sea of a coastal nation (Straits of Tiran, Strait of Juan de Fuca, Strait of Baltiysk) and (2) in straits formed by an island of a state bordering the strait and its mainland if there exists seaward of the island a route through the high seas or through an exclusive economic zone of similar convenience with respect to navigational and hydrographical characteristics (Strait of Messina, Pentland Firth). There may be no suspension of innocent passage through such straits.

See also 
List of straits
Strait passage
Choke point

References

Bibliography 

 Longhitano S., 2013. A facies-based depositional model for ancient and modern, tectonically–confined tidal straits. Terra Nova, 25,6, 446-452

External links

 
Coastal and oceanic landforms
Bodies of water